Patrick Wiesmach (born 23 March 1990) is a Danish handball player for SC DHfK Leipzig and the Danish national team.

References

1990 births
Living people
Danish male handball players